is an original Japanese anime television series animated by Asahi Production and produced by DMM Pictures. It is directed by Akira Oguro and written by Norimitsu Kaihō, with Shūji Katayama and Akinari Suzuki composing the music. Original character designs are provided by Ashito Ōyari, while Hiroshi Shimizu and Masato Kato adapt the designs for animation. It premiered on January 7, 2023, on the Super Animeism programming block on MBS and other affiliates. Penguin Research performed the opening theme song , while Harumi performed the ending theme song . Sentai Filmworks licensed the series outside of Asia. Medialink licensed the series in Asia-Pacific. A manga adaptation by Toshinori Ito began serialization online via Kobunsha's Comic Nettai manga website on January 27, 2023.

Characters

Episode list

Notes

References

External links
 Anime official website 
 

2023 anime television series debuts
Anime with original screenplays
Animeism
Asahi Production
Kobunsha
Medialink
Seinen manga
Sentai Filmworks